This is a list of candidates for the 2013 Western Australian state election. The election was held on 9 March 2013.

Redistribution and seat changes

A redistribution was completed in 2011. The most significant changes were:
The Labor-held seat of Mindarie was renamed Butler.
The Liberal-held seat of Morley became notionally Labor.
The seat of Nollamara was replaced by the new seat of Mirrabooka.
The Labor-held seat of North West was replaced by the National-held seat of North West Central.
The National-held seat of Blackwood-Stirling had been renamed Warren-Blackwood.
Labor MLC for East Metropolitan Ljiljanna Ravlich contested North Metropolitan.
Two National Party MLCs, Mia Davies (Agricultural) and Wendy Duncan (Mining and Pastoral), contested the lower house seats of Central Wheatbelt and Kalgoorlie respectively.
The National Party MLA for Central Wheatbelt, Brendon Grylls, contested the seat of Pilbara.
Greens MLC for North Metropolitan Giz Watson contested the region of South West.

Retiring MPs

Labor

 John Kobelke MLA (Balcatta)
 Carol Martin MLA (Kimberley)
 Eric Ripper MLA (Belmont)
 Tom Stephens MLA (Pilbara)
 Martin Whitely MLA (Bassendean)
 Helen Bullock MLC (Mining and Pastoral)
 Ed Dermer MLC (North Metropolitan)
 Linda Savage MLC (East Metropolitan)

Liberal

 Christian Porter MLA (Bateman) — to contest the federal seat of Pearce
 Norman Moore MLC (Mining and Pastoral)

National

 Grant Woodhams MLA (Moore)

Independent

 John Bowler MLA (Kalgoorlie)
 Liz Constable MLA (Churchlands)

Legislative Assembly
Incumbent members are shown in bold text. Successful candidates are highlighted in the relevant colour.

Legislative Council

Six candidates are elected in each region. Incumbent members in are shown in bold text. Tickets that elected at least one MLC are highlighted in the relevant colour. Successful candidates are identified by an asterisk (*).

Agricultural Region

East Metropolitan Region

Mining and Pastoral Region

North Metropolitan Region

South Metropolitan Region

South West Region

Unregistered parties and groups
The Socialist Alliance endorsed Sanna Andrew in Fremantle, Farida Iqbal in Perth and Sam Wainwright in Willagee.

External links
ABC Elections

Notes

2013 elections in Australia
Candidates for Western Australian state elections